William Henry Harrison (1866 – 23 December 1936) was an English first-class cricketer who made a single appearance for Hampshire County Cricket Club in the 1902 County Championship, playing his only match against Warwickshire.

Harrison died in Salisbury, Wiltshire, on 23 December 1936.

External links

1866 births
1936 deaths
People from Test Valley
English cricketers
Hampshire cricketers